Mount Arden is a locality in the Australian state of South Australia located about  north of the state capital of Adelaide and about  north of the municipal seat in Port Augusta. 

Mount Arden's boundaries were created on 26 April 2013 and given the “local established name” which is derived from the pastoral station of the same name.  Its boundaries align approximately with those of the pastoral station.

The area is an arid plain between the Flinders Ranges and the highway and south of Lake Torrens, and exhibits some salt flats. 

Mount Arden is located within the federal division of Grey, the state electoral district of Giles, and the local government areas of the City of Port Augusta and the Pastoral Unincorporated Area of South Australia.

References

Towns in South Australia
Far North (South Australia)
Places in the unincorporated areas of South Australia